Ntames, is a Cretan folk dance from Rethymno, Greece. It is very widespread in Crete. It is danced by couples.

See also
Music of Greece
Greek dances

References
Ελληνικοί παραδοσιακοί χοροί: Nτάμες

Greek dances